Gauruncus is a genus of moths belonging to the family Tortricidae.

Species
Gauruncus argillus Razowski & Pelz, 2006
Gauruncus armatus Razowski & Pelz, 2006
Gauruncus curvatus Razowski & Pelz, 2006
Gauruncus gampsognathos Razowski, 1988
Gauruncus gelastes Razowski, 1988
Gauruncus gracilis Razowski & Pelz, 2006
Gauruncus intermedius Razowski & Becker, 2002
Gauruncus ischyros Razowski & Pelz, 2013
Gauruncus laudatus Razowski & Pelz, 2003
Gauruncus molinopampae Razowski & Wojtusiak, 2010
Gauruncus rossi Razowski & Pelz, 2006
Gauruncus simplicissimus Razowski & Pelz, 2003
Gauruncus tomaszi Razowski & Wojtusiak, 2013
Gauruncus venezolanus Razowski & Brown, 2004

See also
List of Tortricidae genera

References

 , 1988, Acta zoologica cracoviensia 31: 404.
 , 2005, World Catalogue of Insects 5
 , 2006: Gauruncus Razowski, 1988 and Galomecalpa Razowski, 1990 from Ecuador (Lepidoptera: Tortricidae: Euliini). Shilap Revista de Lepidopterologia 34 (135): 289–303. Full article: .
 , 2010: Tortricidae (Lepidoptera) from Peru. Acta Zoologica Cracoviensia 53B (1-2): 73-159. . Full article:  .

External links
tortricidae.com

Euliini
Tortricidae genera